Mercer Island High School (MIHS) is a public high school located in Mercer Island, Washington, United States, as part of the Mercer Island School District.

As of the 2018–19 school year, the school had an enrollment of 1,552 students and 77.5 classroom teachers (on an FTE basis), for a student–teacher ratio of 20.0:1. There were 44 students (2.8% of enrollment) eligible for free lunch and 13 (0.8% of students) eligible for reduced-cost lunch.

Awards and recognition
During the 2006-07 school year, Mercer Island High School was recognized with the Blue Ribbon School Award of Excellence by the United States Department of Education.

Music program
Mercer Island High school is renowned for its music program and marching band. The marching band's first foray into the national spotlight was in 1993 when it participated in the 104th Rose Parade. In 2006, the marching band would return to Pasadena for the 117th Rose Parade. The parade was nearly cancelled due to record rain for the first time during a Rose Parade in 50 years. In 2011, the MIHS marching band traveled internationally to participate in the 2011  London, England New Year’s Day Parade & Festival upon royal invitation. The following year, the marching band performed in the 2012 Rose Parade. In the fall of the same year, the marching band performed along with Newport High School at halftime of the November 4 Seattle Seahawks football game versus the Minnesota Vikings. In the spring of 2014, the marching band would travel to Victoria, British Columbia to participate in the 116th Victoria Day parade. In the fall of the same year, Mercer Island and Newport would return along with Cedarcrest High School  for a halftime performance at the December 14 Seahawks game versus the San Francisco 49ers. In 2015, members of the marching and concert bands would travel to Australia as part of a tour including participation in the Australian National Band Championships. In 2017, the marching band returned to Victoria to participate in the 119th Victoria Day Parade. In 2019, the marching band would return to Pasadena to participate in the Rose Parade. The marching band would go on to perform a special halftime performance at the October 10, 2019 Seahawks game against the Los Angeles Rams, honoring longtime team owner and Mercer Island resident Paul G. Allen. In 2020, the marching band was scheduled to perform at the 123rd Victoria Day parade but the event was cancelled due to the COVID-19 pandemic. On September 19, 2021 the marching band would once again take to the field for the 2021 Seahawks home opener against the Tennessee Titans, performing during pregame and appearing at halftime alongside Macklemore and singer-guitarist Ayron Jones.

Athletics

Mercer Island High School was honored by the Washington Interscholastic Activities Association as the 3A Wells Fargo Scholastic Cup Champion for the 2005-06 school year, based on State championship victories in boys' track and field, boys' golf, boys' swimming and diving and boys' tennis.

The boys lacrosse team was WHSBLA Division II state champion in 1996 (defeating Vashon High School in the tournament final) and won the Division I title in 2001 (vs. Bainbridge High School), 2004 (vs. Bainbridge), 2005 (vs.  Issaquah High School), 2006 (vs. Issaquah), 2011 (vs. Bainbridge) and 2015 (vs. Bellevue High School)

Girls' Swim and Dive had an undefeated season in 2009 ending it by winning the State Championship.
Boys' Swim and Dive also went undefeated in the 2009-2010 season, and went on to win their fifth consecutive State title.

The girls' and boys' tennis teams have won a combined 41 State championships since 1972. The girls tennis team has won 25 state titles and has been inducted into the Washington Interscholastic Activities Association Hall of Fame.

The basketball team, formerly coached by all-time Washington state wins leader Ed Pepple, recorded its first losing season in 38 years in 2006.

In 1981 Mercer Island Basketball Team lost the AAA State basketball final game to Shadle Park in a controversial decision. At 64-65 to Mercer Island, a last-second shot by Shadle Park "depending on who you are listening to, either clearly did or clearly didn’t beat the air horn."

Boys' swimming was rated first in its class by the 2006-07 NISCA National Dual Meet Team Rankings.

The “tropical warrior” Islander mascot of the ‘70’s was deemed to be offensive and has not been used since.

Notable alumni

Bill Anschell ('77), jazz pianist and composer.
Mark Bathum ('77), Paralympic alpine skier who has competed at two Winter Paralympics, two World Cups and two World Championships.
Daniel Bonjour ('99), actor, director, writer.
Matt Boyd (born 1991), professional baseball pitcher for Detroit Tigers.
Steve Bunin ('92), ESPN commentator
Travis DeCuire (born 1970), basketball head coach, University of Montana.
Stanley Ann Dunham ('60), mother of former U.S. President Barack Obama
Jean Enersen (born 1944), journalist who worked for 48 years at KING-TV in Seattle.
Josh Fisher ('00), former professional basketball player
Caroline Fraser ('79), writer who won the 2018 Pulitzer Prize for Biography or Autobiography.
 Pétur Guðmundsson (born 1958), Icelandic former professional basketball player and coach who was the first Icelander ever to play in the NBA.
Alex Goyette ('07), film writer, director.
Adrian Hanauer (born 1966), owner of Pacific Coast Feather Co., majority owner and general manager of Seattle Sounders FC.
Bill Hanson (born c. 1940), retired professional basketball player who played for Real Madrid Baloncesto.
Steve Hawes, played ten seasons (1974–84) in NBA for Houston Rockets, Portland Trail Blazers, Atlanta Hawks, and Seattle SuperSonics
David Kirtman ('01), fullback for New Orleans Saints
Aaron Levie ('03), co-founder of Box.net
Ben Mahdavi ('98), former NFL linebacker and long snapper.
Joel McHale ('91), actor, Jeff Winger in NBC's Community, host of E! Entertainment Television's The Soup.
Jordan Morris ('13), player for United States men's national soccer team and Seattle Sounders FC.
Annie Parisse ('93), actress who has been featured on Law & Order and As the World Turns
 Steve Penny (born 1964), businessman and sports administrator who was President and CEO of USA Gymnastics from 2005 to 2017.
Owen Pochman ('95), football player for New York Giants and San Francisco 49ers
Nancy Ramey (born 1940), competition swimmer who represented the United States at the 1956 Summer Olympics in Melbourne, Australia, where she won a silver medal in the 100 meter butterfly.
Anne Rosellini, film producer
Ethan Sandler ('91), writer and actor.
Avi Schiffmann ('21), creator of the world's biggest COVID-19 tracker.
Dylan Smith ('03),  co-founder of Box.net
Quin Snyder ('85), head coach of NBA's Utah Jazz
Gordon Sondland ('75), U.S. Ambassador to the European Union
Darby Stanchfield, actress 
Dave Wainhouse, ('85) former MLB player (Montreal Expos, Seattle Mariners, Pittsburgh Pirates, Colorado Rockies, St. Louis Cardinals)
Mary Wayte, ('83) Olympic gold medalist in 200m freestyle in 1984.
Sean White ('99), MLB pitcher for Seattle Mariners.
Peter Daniel Young ('95), animal rights activist.

Notable faculty
Gillian d'Hondt (born 1982), women's basketball coach, professional European women's basketball player.
 Sheryl Swoopes (born 1971), former professional basketball player, who was the first player to be signed in the WNBA.

References

External links
Official site

1957 establishments in Washington (state)
Educational institutions established in 1957
High schools in King County, Washington
Public high schools in Washington (state)